Juan Manuel Espinosa Valenzuela (born 8 August 1984), known as Juanma, is a Spanish footballer who plays for UD Melilla as a central midfielder.

Club career
Born in Jaén, Andalusia, Juanma made his senior debut with Martos CD. He first arrived in Segunda División B in the 2005–06 season, starting often and being relegated with RSD Alcalá.

In the following years, Juanma alternated between the third level and Tercera División, representing Polideportivo Ejido B, Ontinyent CF, Burgos CF, CD Móstoles and Atlético Mancha Real. On 8 July 2011 he signed with Real Jaén, achieving promotion to division two at the end of the 2012–13 campaign and contributing with 36 appearances to the feat.

On 18 August 2013, at already 29, Juanma played his first game as a professional, starting in a 1–2 home loss against SD Eibar. He scored his first and only goal in the second tier on 15 December, helping the hosts defeat RCD Mallorca 2–1.

References

External links

1984 births
Living people
Footballers from Jaén, Spain
Spanish footballers
Association football midfielders
Segunda División players
Segunda División B players
Tercera División players
Martos CD footballers
RSD Alcalá players
Ontinyent CF players
Burgos CF footballers
CD Móstoles footballers
Real Jaén footballers
Cádiz CF players
Hércules CF players
UD Melilla footballers